In the UEFA qualification for 2011 FIFA Women's World Cup, 41 entrants were drawn into eight groups, from which the group winners advanced to a play-off round.  The four winners of the play-off round advanced directly to join Germany (the hosts) in the finals tournament, while the four play-off losers played two further knock-out rounds to determine a nation to play-off with the third-placed CONCACAF nation for a finals place.

This scheme was a significant change from previous editions of qualification as all entrants had the ability to advance to the final tournament.  In previous years only those nations belonging to the First Category of European women's football were able to qualify, with a system approximating promotion and relegation between qualification tournaments operating.

Qualifying round

The groups were drawn on 17 March 2009, with the matches held from 15 August 2009 to 25 August 2010.  The eight group winners advanced to the play-off stages.

Seeding

Seeding was based on results in 2007 FIFA Women's World Cup and UEFA Women's Euro 2009 qualifying. There were five seeding pots, each containing eight teams except for the fifth, Pot E, which had nine and provided two nations for Group 1.

We report in bold the teams which actually qualified to the 2011 FIFA Women's World Cup.

Group 1

Group 2

Group 3

Group 4

Group 5

Group 6

Group 7

Group 8

Play-off stages

Seeding

The eight UEFA qualification group winners qualified for the play-offs.  The play-off draw was seeded according to results in this qualifying competition and those for UEFA Women's EURO 2009.

Direct qualification

Each seeded team was drawn against an unseeded opponent to play a two-legged tie.  The four winners advanced to the finals in Germany.  The four losers advanced to the repechage rounds for a chance to qualify against a CONCACAF opponent.

Ties were drawn on 30 August with the first legs scheduled for 11–12 September and the return legs on 15–16 September.

|}

Repechage I

The four losers from the direct qualification play-offs met in two sets of two-legged ties on 2 and 6 October.  The winners advanced to the second repechage round.

|}

Repechage II

The two winners from the first repechage round met in a two-legged tie on 23 and 27 October.  The winner advanced to play the third-placed team from the CONCACAF qualification for a spot in the 2011 FIFA Women's World Cup finals.

|}

Italy won 5–2 on aggregate and advanced to the UEFA-CONCACAF play-off.

References and notes
 UEFA Site

 
2009 in women's association football
2010 in women's association football
UEFA
Women
Women
2011